Oncideres mirim is a species of beetle in the family Cerambycidae. It was described by Martins and Galileo in 1996. It is known from Brazil.

References

mirim
Beetles described in 1996